Mandrilland is the fifth album by the Brooklyn-based soul/funk band Mandrill. Released in August 1974 as a double album, Mandrilland was the band's last album on Polydor.

Track listing 
All songs written and arranged by Mandrill

"Positive Thing" 	3:25 	
"Positive Thing +" 	5:15 	
"Skying Upward" 	3:45 	
"The Road to Love" 	5:15 	
"Armadillo" 	1:48 	
"The Reason I Sing" 	3:22 	
"Bro' Weevil & the Swallow" 	4:48 	
"Khidja" 	4:55 	
"House of Wood" 	7:59 	
"'Drill in the Bush" 	3:55 	
"El Funko" 	2:54 	
"Love is Sunshine" 	4:22 	
"Folks on a Hill" 	6:22 	
"Mini-Suite for Duke" 	6:26 	
"Cal-Ipso" 	5:00 	
"After The Race" 	7:02 	
"Lady Jane" 	4:00

Personnel 
Carlos Wilson - saxophone, vocals
Lou Wilson - percussion, trumpet, vocals
Ric Wilson - saxophone
Claude Cave - keyboards, vocals
Fudgie Kae - bass, percussion, vocals 
Douglas Rodrigues - guitar, percussion, vocals
Neftali Santiago - drums, percussion, vocals

Charts

Singles

References

External links
 Mandrill-Mandrilland at Discogs

1974 albums
Mandrill (band) albums
Polydor Records albums
Albums recorded at Studio in the Country